Olefin fiber is a synthetic fiber made from a polyolefin, such as polypropylene or polyethylene. It is used in wallpaper, carpeting, ropes, and vehicle interiors.

Olefin's advantages are its strength, colorfastness and comfort, its resistance to staining, mildew, abrasion, and sunlight, and its good bulk and cover.

History
Italy began production of olefin fibers in 1957.  The chemist Giulio Natta successfully formulated olefin suitable for more textile applications.  Both Natta and Karl Ziegler were later awarded the Nobel Prize for their work on transition metal catalysis of olefins to fiber, also known as Ziegler–Natta catalysis.  Production of olefin fibers in the U.S. began in 1960. Olefin fibers account for 16% of all manufactured fibers.

Major fiber properties
Olefin fibers have great bulk and cover while having low specific gravity. This means “Warmth without the weight.” The fibers have low moisture absorption, but they can wick moisture and dry quickly. Olefin is abrasion, stain, sunlight, fire, and chemical resistant. It does not dye well, but has the advantage of being colorfast. Since Olefin has a low melting point, textiles can be thermally bonded. The fibers have the lowest static of all manufactured fibers and a medium luster. One of the most important properties of olefin is its strength. It keeps its strength in wet or dry conditions and is very resilient. The fiber can be produced for strength of different properties.

Production method
The Federal Trade Commission's official definition of olefin fiber is “A manufactured fiber in which the fiber forming substance is any long-chain synthetic polymer composed of at least 85% by weight of ethylene, propylene, or other olefin units”

Polymerization of propylene and ethylene gases, controlled with special catalysts, creates olefin fibers. Dye is added directly to the polymer before melt spinning is applied. Additives, polymer variations and different process conditions can create a range of characteristics.

High pressure production, which uses ten tons per square inch, creates a film for molded materials. Low pressure production uses a low temperature with a catalyst and hydrocarbon solvent. This process is less expensive and produces a polyethylene polymer more for textile use.

The polymer is then melted, spun, by a spinneret  into water, or air cooled. The fiber is drawn out to six times the spun length. Gel spinning is a new method in which a gel form of polyethylene polymers is used.

Physical and chemical structure

Physical
Olefin fibers can be multi- or monofilament and staple, tow, or film yarns. The fibers are colorless and round in cross section. This cross section can be modified for different end uses. The physical characteristics are a waxy feel and colorless.

Chemical
There are two types of polymers that can be used in olefin fibers. The first, polyethylene, is a simple linear structure with repeating units. These fibers are used mainly for ropes, twines and utility fabrics.

The second type, polypropylene, is a three-dimensional structure with a backbone of carbon atoms. Methyl groups protrude from this backbone. Stereoselective polymerization orders these methyl groups to the same spatial placement. This creates a crystalline polypropylene polymer. The fibers made with these polymers can be used in apparel, furnishing and industrial products.

Manufacturers 
The first commercial producer of an olefin fiber in the United States was Hercules, Inc. (FiberVisions). Other U.S. olefin fiber producers include Asota; American Fibers and Yarns Co; American Synthetic Fiber, LLC; Color-Fi; FiberVisions; Foss Manufacturing Co., LLC; Drake Extrusion; Filament Fiber Technology, Inc.; TenCate Geosynthetics; Universal Fiber Systems LLC.

Trademarks according to fabric use
Producer – Allied-Signal
A.C.E. – Tire cord, furniture webbing

Producer – DuPont
CoolMax – Warm-weather and action wear
Hollofil, Quallofil – Fiberfill and insulating fibers
Sontara – Spunlaced nonwoven fabrics
Thermostat – Cold-weather wear
Thermoloft – Fiberfill and insulating fibers
Tyvek – Used for house wraps to postal envelopes to clothing

Producer – Trevira
ESP – Apparel and furnishings
Celwet – Nonwovens
Comfort Fiber – Staple fiber for apparel uses
Floor Guardian – Gym Floor Carpet Protection System
Loftguard – Staple fiber for industrial uses
Polar Guard
Lambda – Filament yarns with spun-yarn characteristics
Serene
Superba
Trevira HT – Marine and military uses; ropes, cordages
Trevira ProEarth – Recycled-content geotextiles
Trevira XPS – Carpeting
BTU – Cold-weather apparel

Producer – 3M
Thinsulate – Cold-weather action wear

Uses

Apparel
Sports & active wear, socks, hoodies, thermal underwear; lining fabrics.

Home furnishing
Olefin can be used by itself or in blends for indoor and outdoor carpets, carpet tiles, and carpet backing.  The fiber can also be used in upholstery, draperies, wall coverings, slipcovers, and floor coverings. It is often used in basements due to its quick-drying and mold-resistant properties.

Automotive
Olefin can be used for interior fabrics, sun visors, arm rests, door and side panels, trunks, parcel shelves, and resin replacement as binder fibers.

Industrial
In an industrial setting, olefin creates carpets; ropes, geo-textiles that are in contact with the soil, filter fabrics, bagging, concrete reinforcement, and heat-sealable paper (e.g. tea- and coffee-bags).

Care procedures
When dry-cleaned, many dry-cleaning solvents can swell Olefin fibers. Since Olefin dries quickly, line drying and low tumble drying with little or no heat is recommended. Since Olefin is not absorbent, waterborne stains do not present a problem. However, oily stains are difficult to remove, though lukewarm water, detergent, and bleach can be used to remove such stains. Olefin fiber has a low melting point (around 225 to 335 °F, depending on the polymer's grade) so care must be taken to iron these at a low temperature, as to prevent melting. Items such as outdoor carpets and other fabrics can be hosed off. Olefin is easy to recycle.

See also
 Alkene
 Elastolefin

References

Synthetic fibers